, also called  ('The Great Trial of Strength'), is a  long bicycle cyclosportive which starts in Trondheim and finishes in Oslo, Norway. It was first held in 1967, initiated by Erik Gjems-Onstad and has taken place since then in late June every year.

In 2012 the record time was 12.51,02.

Den Lille Styrkeprøven

1997 recumbent ban controversy 
In 1997, Bram Moens from the Netherlands rode his faired recumbent in the race, finishing at 13:46:08 – almost two hours ahead of the second rider, and setting a new course record. Bram Moens and his bike were cleared by the organizers to start, and recumbents had taken part many times before. Despite this, the record was not accepted by the organizers, and recumbent bicycles banned, both actions without claiming any rider misbehaviour.

References

External links
 Official site

Cycling in Norway
Recurring sporting events established in 1967